Sonata Software Limited is an Indian information technology services company, based in Bangalore. Sonata provides services in business intelligence and analytics, application development management (ADM), mobility, cloud, social media, testing, enterprise services (ERP and CRM), and infrastructure management services.

History 
Founded in 1986 as the IT division of Indian Organic Chemicals, the company spun off as an independent entity in 1994. The company became a public company in 1998. In 2001, the company obtained SEI-CMMI Level 5 certification and in the following years, set up offices in the US, Europe and Asia Pacific.

In March 2014, it opened an American branch in Redmond, Washington. In August 2014, Sonata Software bought a controlling stake in Rezopia, a travel reservation agency that was the first to use the cloud for taking reservations. It also acquired Xyka, Rezopia's service provider.

In April 2015, the company entered into a partnership with the National Institute of Technology, Tiruchirappalli to promote entrepreneurship by providing resources for NIT, Tiruchirappalli's Centre for Entrepreneurship Development and Incubation. In August 2015, It acquired a 100% stake in Halosys Technologies, which specialized in mobile enterprise. In October 2015, Sonata Software acquired Interactive Business Information Systems Inc (IBIS), a Georgia based supply chain software company founded in 1989.

In August 2016, Parablu, the US-based provider of CASB-enabled cloud security solutions for Enterprises announced a partnership with Sonata Software.

In March 2020, Sonata Software announced the signing of a definitive agreement to acquire Melbourne-based Customer Experience company GAPbuster Limited (GBW).

In August 2021, Sonata Software announced the signing of a definitive agreement to acquire San Jose based Encore Software Services.

In February 2023, Sonata Software announced the acquisition of US-based data analytics and cloud modernization company Quant Systems in a deal worth up to $160 million.

Subsidiaries

Its subsidiaries and affiliates include:
 Sonata Software Limited.
 Sonata Software FZ — LLC
 Sonata Information Technology Limited (SITL)
 Sonata Software North America Inc.
 Sonata Software GmbH
 Sonata Europe Limited
 Encore Software Services
 Sonata Scalable Australia
 Sonata Sopris USA
 Sonata Software Qatar WLL
 Halosys Technologies

Sonata's shares are publicly traded in Indian Stock Exchanges. Sonata Software has been assessed at SEI CMMI (Dev) Ver1.2-Level 5 certified, for its development centers in Bangalore and Hyderabad.

Global offices

Asia-Pacific
 Singapore: Singapore

America
 USA: Fremont; Atlanta; Princeton; Newton; Redmond; Schaumburg

Europe
 Germany: Frankfurt, Hanover
 UK: Middlesex, Cheshire
 Netherlands: Amsterdam

Middle-East
 UAE: Dubai
 Qatar: Doha

See also
 Fortune India 500
 List of Indian IT companies
 List of companies of India

References

External links

 

Information technology companies of Bangalore
Outsourcing companies
Software companies of India
Software companies established in 1986
Indian companies established in 1986
1986 establishments in Karnataka
Companies listed on the National Stock Exchange of India
Companies listed on the Bombay Stock Exchange